The Dhaka Premier Division Cricket League, also known as the Dhaka Premier League, is a club List A tournament in Bangladesh.

History
Since its inauguration in 1973–74 the league has been the premier club cricket competition in Bangladesh. It gained List A status starting with the 2013–14 tournament, thus superseding the National Cricket League One-Day as Bangladesh's main List A competition.

In the years from 1973–74 to 2011–12, Abahani Limited won the championship 17 times. Other winners were Mohammedan Sporting Club nine times, Biman Bangladesh Airlines five times, Victoria Sporting Club four times, Old DOHS Sports Club twice and Brothers Union once. There was no tournament in 2012–13.

To commemorate the centenary of the birth of the founding father of Bangladesh, Bangabandhu Sheikh Mujibur Rahman, the 2019–20 season of the league was named "Bangabandhu Dhaka Premier Division Cricket League 2019–20". However, the competition was postponed shortly after starting and later abandoned, owing to the COVID-19 pandemic. The next tournament, in 2021–22, was officially named the "Bangabandhu Dhaka Premier Division Cricket League 2021–2022 sponsored by Walton".

List A winners
Since the tournament gained List A status, the winners have been:
 2013–14: Gazi Tank Cricketers
 2014–15: Prime Bank
 2015–16: Abahani Limited
 2006–17: Gazi Group Cricketers
 2017–18: Abahani Limited
 2018–19: Abahani Limited
 2019–20: abandoned due to COVID-19 pandemic
 2020–21: cancelled due to COVID-19 pandemic
 2021–22: Sheikh Jamal Dhanmondi Club
 2022–23: in progress

Notes: This competition was played in the early part of the season in both 2013–14 and 2014–15. Starting in 2016, it is now played during the spring months each year.

Format
The competition is played as a round-robin, followed by play-off rounds among the top six teams for the championship and among the lowest three teams to determine relegation.

The 2013–14 competition ran from September to November 2014; the 2014–15 competition ran from November 2014 to January 2015; the 2015–16 competition ran from April to June 2016; the 2016–17 competition ran from April to June 2017; the 2017–18 competition ran from February to April 2018; the 2018–19 competition ran from March to April 2019; the 2019–20 competition began in March 2020, but was almost immediately postponed owing to the COVID-19 pandemic; the next tournament, 2021–22, ran from March to April 2022.

All matches are played on neutral grounds in the Dhaka area. In 2016–17 only three grounds were used: Khan Shaheb Osman Ali Stadium in Fatullah, and Bangladesh Krira Shikkha Protisthan No 3 and No 4 Grounds in Savar. The same three grounds were used in 2017–18 and 2018–19, as well as Sher-e-Bangla National Cricket Stadium in Mirpur.

Players
The system of allocating players to clubs varies from season to season, but has elements of lottery. Players frequently change clubs between seasons. Imrul Kayes, for example, played for Victoria Sporting Club  in 2006–07 and 2014–15, Mohammedan Sporting Club in 2007–08 and 2011–12, Gazi Tank Cricketers in 2008–09 and 2013–14, Abahani Limited in 2009–10 and 2010–11, Brothers Union in 2015–16, Sheikh Jamal Dhanmondi Club in 2016–17 and 2021–22, and Gazi Group Cricketers in 2017–18 and 2018–19. Of the 22 players who appeared for Brothers Union in 2013–14, only two were among the 20 Brothers Union players in 2014–15.

From the 1980s to the 2019–20 competition most teams included players from outside Bangladesh. In 2013–14 82 foreign players played in the competition. Beginning with the 2015–16 competition, only one foreign player has been allowed in any playing eleven, although clubs are allowed to have several foreign players on their list; in 2015–16 36 foreign players took part, including 22 Indians and 10 Sri Lankans. Foreign players were excluded from the 2019–20 competition, but were allowed again for the 2021–22 competition, with no more than one foreign player per team.

Teams
There are 12 participating teams, changing each season with promotion and relegation. The two lowest-finishing teams are demoted to the second division (known as the Dhaka First Division League) for the next season and the top two teams in the second division are promoted.

2013–14

Abahani Limited
Brothers Union
Cricket Coaching School
Gazi Tank Cricketers
Kala Bagan Cricket Academy
Kala Bagan Krira Chakra
Khelaghar Samaj Kallyan Samity
Mohammedan Sporting Club
Prime Bank
Prime Doleshwar Sporting Club
Sheikh Jamal Dhanmondi Club
Victoria Sporting Club

Cricket Coaching School played the first six matches but were demoted after failing to arrive at their seventh match in time to play.

2014–15

Abahani Limited
Brothers Union
Kala Bagan Cricket Academy
Kala Bagan Krira Chakra
Legends of Rupganj
Mohammedan Sporting Club
Old DOHS Sports Club
Partex Sporting Club
Prime Bank
Prime Doleshwar Sporting Club
Sheikh Jamal Dhanmondi Club
Victoria Sporting Club

Gazi Tank Cricketers changed their name to Legends of Rupganj.

2015–16

Abahani Limited
Brothers Union
Cricket Coaching School
Gazi Group Cricketers
Kala Bagan Cricket Academy
Kala Bagan Krira Chakra
Legends of Rupganj
Mohammedan Sporting Club
Prime Bank
Prime Doleshwar Sporting Club
Sheikh Jamal Dhanmondi Club
Victoria Sporting Club

2016–17

Abahani Limited
Brothers Union
Gazi Group Cricketers
Kala Bagan Krira Chakra
Khelaghar Samaj Kallyan Samity
Legends of Rupganj
Mohammedan Sporting Club
Partex Sporting Club
Prime Bank
Prime Doleshwar Sporting Club
Sheikh Jamal Dhanmondi Club
Victoria Sporting Club

2017–18

 Abahani Limited
 Agrani Bank Cricket Club
 Brothers Union
 Gazi Group Cricketers
 Kala Bagan Krira Chakra
 Khelaghar Samaj Kallyan Samity
 Legends of Rupganj
 Mohammedan Sporting Club
 Prime Bank Cricket Club
 Prime Doleshwar Sporting Club
 Sheikh Jamal Dhanmondi Club
 Shinepukur Cricket Club

2018–19

 Abahani Limited
 Bangladesh Krira Shikkha Protishtan
 Brothers Union
 Gazi Group Cricketers
 Khelaghar Samaj Kallyan Samity
 Legends of Rupganj
 Mohammedan Sporting Club
 Prime Bank Cricket Club
 Prime Doleshwar Sporting Club
 Sheikh Jamal Dhanmondi Club
 Shinepukur Cricket Club
 Uttara Sporting Club

2019–20

 Abahani Limited
 Brothers Union
 Gazi Group Cricketers
 Khelaghar Samaj Kallyan Samity
 Legends of Rupganj
 Mohammedan Sporting Club
 Old DOHS Sports Club
 Partex Sporting Club
 Prime Bank Cricket Club
 Prime Doleshwar Sporting Club
 Sheikh Jamal Dhanmondi Club
 Shinepukur Cricket Club

Owing to the COVID-19 pandemic, the tournament was abandoned shortly after it began.

2021–22

 Abahani Limited
 Brothers Union
 City Club
 Gazi Group Cricketers
 Khelaghar Samaj Kallyan Samity
 Legends of Rupganj
 Mohammedan Sporting Club
 Prime Bank Cricket Club
 Rupganj Tigers Cricket Club
 Sheikh Jamal Dhanmondi Club
 Shinepukur Cricket Club

Prime Doleshwar Sporting Club were scheduled to take part, but withdrew shortly before the tournament began, leaving 11 teams.

Records

Highest score
 2013–14 – 157 not out by Ravi Bopara (Prime Bank) 
 2014–15 – 161 not out by Chamara Kapugedera (Victoria Sporting Club) 
 2015–16 – 142 by Tamim Iqbal (Abahani Limited)
 2016–17 – 190 by Raqibul Hasan (Mohammedan Sporting Club)
 2017–18 – 154 by Soumya Sarkar (Agrani Bank Cricket Club)
 2018–19 – 208* by Soumya Sarkar (Abahani Limited)
 2021–22 – 184 by Anamul Haque (Prime Bank)

Best bowling figures
 2013–14 – 7 for 25 by Sean Williams (Brothers Union)
 2014–15 – 6 for 33 by Naeem Islam (Legends of Rupganj)
 2015–16 – 7 for 58 by Saqlain Sajib (Abahani Limited)
 2016–17 – 6 for 18 by Tanvir Islam (Khelaghar Samaj Kallyan Samity)
 2017–18 – 8 for 40 by Yeasin Arafat (Gazi Group Cricketers)
 2018–19 – 6 for 46 by Mashrafe Mortaza (Abahani Limited)
 2021–22 – 6 for 22 by Al-Amin (Gazi Group Cricketers)

Most runs in a season
 2013–14 – 670 by Ravi Bopara (Prime Bank)
 2014–15 – 714 by Rony Talukdar (Prime Doleshwar Sporting Club)
 2015–16 – 719 by Raqibul Hasan (Prime Doleshwar)
 2016–17 – 752 by Liton Das (Abahani Limited)
 2017–18 – 749 by Nazmul Hossain Shanto (Abahani Limited)
 2018–19 – 814 by Saif Hassan (Prime Doleshwar)
 2021–22 – 1138 by Anamul Haque (Prime Bank)

Most wickets in a season
 2013–14 – 29 by Arafat Sunny (Gazi Tank Cricketers) and Farhad Reza (Prime Doleshwar)
 2014–15 – 31 by Elias Sunny (Prime Doleshwar)
 2015–16 – 30 by Chaturanga de Silva (Victoria Sporting Club)
 2016–17 – 35 by Abu Haider (Gazi Group Cricketers)
 2017–18 – 39 by Mashrafe Mortaza (Abahani Limited)
 2018–19 – 38 by Farhad Reza (Prime Doleshwar)
 2021–22 – 29 by Rakibul Hasan (Prime Bank)

Other records
The fastest century is by Brendan Taylor, who reached 100 off 46 balls for Prime Bank against Kalabagan Cricket Academy in 2013–14.

The highest team score is 393 for 4 by Abahani against Prime Doleshwar in 2017–18.

References

External links
 Official Bangladesh Cricket Board website
 "The original premier league" by Mohammad Isam at Cricinfo
 Dhaka Premier Division 2013–14 at CricketArchive
 Dhaka Premier Division 2014–15 at CricketArchive
 Dhaka Premier Division 2015–16 at CricketArchive
 Dhaka Premier Division 2016–17 at CricketArchive
 Dhaka Premier Division 2017–18 at CricketArchive
 Dhaka Premier Division 2021–22 at CricketArchive

 
Bangladeshi domestic cricket competitions
List A cricket competitions
Cricket in Dhaka
Sports leagues established in 1973
1973 establishments in Bangladesh